Urgaza (Urğaźa) is a rural locality (a selo) and the administrative centre of Zilairsky Selsoviet, Baymaksky District, Bashkortostan, Russia. The population was 2,257 as of 2010. There are 22 streets.

Geography 
Urgaza is located 50 km southeast of Baymak (the district's administrative centre) by road. Ishmukhametovo is the nearest rural locality.

References 

Rural localities in Baymaksky District